The men's lightweight event was part of the weightlifting programme at the 1928 Summer Olympics. The weight class was the second-lightest contested, and allowed weightlifters of up to 67.5 kilograms (148.8 pounds). The competition was held on Saturday, 28 July 1928.

Records
These were the standing world and Olympic records (in kilograms) prior to the 1928 Summer Olympics.

(*) Originally a five lift competition.

All four Olympic records were improved in this competition. Hans Haas and Kurt Helbig equalized the standing world record in clean and jerk.

Results

All figures in kilograms.

References

Sources
 Olympic Report 
 

Lightweight